A Dangerous Game (also known as Who Killed Doc Robbin?) is a 1941 American mystery film directed by John Rawlins and starring Richard Arlen, Andy Devine and Jean Brooks. It is part of Universal Pictures's Aces of Action series. The New York Times called the film "a crack-brained murder mystery."

Cast
 Richard Arlen as Dick Williams
 Andy Devine as Andy McAllister
 Jean Brooks as Anne Bennett 
 Edward Brophy as Bugsy 
 Marc Lawrence as Joe
 Rudolph Anders as Dr. Fleming 
 Richard Carle as Agatha - alias Mooseface Hogarty
 Andrew Tombes as Silas Biggsby 
 Tom Dugan as Clem
 Vince Barnett as Ephriam
 Mira McKinney as Mrs. Hubbard
 Richard Kean as Mr. Whipple
 Irving Mitchell as Dr. Robin
 George Pembroke as Olaf Anderson

References

External links
A Dangerous Game at TCMDB
A Dangerous Game at IMDb

1941 films
American crime comedy films
1940s crime comedy films
1940s comedy mystery films
American comedy mystery films
American black-and-white films
Films directed by John Rawlins
Universal Pictures films
1940s English-language films
1940s American films